Interiotherins are bio-active isolates of Kadsura.

Notes

Austrobaileyales